ASGP may refer to:

The Association of State Green Parties, former name of The Green Party of the United States (GP.org)
A Small Garlic Press, a nonprofit poetry press in Chicago, Illinois, USA, since 1995.  Publishes Agnieszka's Dowry 
Association of Secretaries General of Parliaments